Robert William Browne  (1809 in Southwark – 1895 in Wells) was the Archdeacon of Bath from 1860 to 1895.

Bothamley was born in Southwark and educated at St John's College, Oxford. He was ordained deacon in 1832; and Priest in 1833. but stayed at St John's, firstly as Fellow and then Tutor  until 1839. In that year he began studying for a PhD at the  University of Heidelberg. In 1862 he became Rector of Weston-Super-Mare; and in 1863 a Canon of Wells Cathedral.
 
He died on 13 December 1895.

Notes

1895 deaths
1809 births
People from Southwark
Alumni of St John's College, Oxford
Heidelberg University alumni
Archdeacons of Bath
British expatriates in Germany